Patti LaBoucane-Benson (born February 20, 1969) is a Canadian academic and politician. A Métis, she serves as director of research at the Native Counselling Services of Alberta. She was appointed to the Senate of Canada on October 3, 2018 by Prime Minister Justin Trudeau.

On January 31, 2020, she was appointed Government Liaison by Representative of the Government in the Senate Marc Gold. The role entails acting as a whip to secure votes for government legislation.

She was the winner of the Burt Award for First Nations, Métis and Inuit Literature in 2016 for The Outside Circle, a graphic novel she cowrote with Kelly Mellings.

References

1969 births
Living people
Canadian senators from Alberta
Independent Canadian senators
Women members of the Senate of Canada
21st-century Canadian politicians
21st-century Canadian novelists
21st-century Canadian women writers
Canadian women novelists
Canadian graphic novelists
Métis writers
Métis politicians
Women in Alberta politics
Female comics writers
21st-century Canadian women politicians